The 8th constituency of Isère is one of ten French legislative constituencies in the Isère département.

After the 2010 redistricting of French legislative constituencies added a tenth constituency to Isère, the 8th constituency consists of the (pre-2015 cantonal re-organisation) cantons of
Heyrieux, Vienne-Nord, Vienne-Sud, Auberives-sur-Varèze, Cheyssieu, Clonas-sur-Varèze, Saint-Alban-du-Rhône, Saint-Clair-du-Rhône, Saint-Maurice-l'Exil, Saint-Prim and Vernioz and the communes of Assieu.

Deputies

Election Results

2022

 
 
 
|-
| colspan="8" bgcolor="#E9E9E9"|
|-

2017

2012

2007

 
 
 
 
 
 
 
|-
| colspan="8" bgcolor="#E9E9E9"|
|-

2002

 
 
 
 
 
 
|-
| colspan="8" bgcolor="#E9E9E9"|
|-

1997

 
 
 
 
 
 
 
 
|-
| colspan="8" bgcolor="#E9E9E9"|
|-

References

8